Eduardo Virgilio Gerónimo Astengo Campodonico  (26 June 1909, in Lima, Perú – 10 September 1979) was a Peruvian football midfielder.

Career 

During his career he has made one appearances for the Peru national team at the FIFA World Cup 1930 against.
His career in club football was spent with Universitario de Deportes.

Honours
Universitario de Deportes
 Peruvian First Division: 1929

References

External links

1909 births
1979 deaths
Footballers from Lima
Association football midfielders
Peruvian footballers
Peru international footballers
1930 FIFA World Cup players
Club Universitario de Deportes footballers
Peruvian Primera División players